Denise Dy (born 16 May 1989) is a Filipino female professional tennis player.

Dy has career-high WTA rankings of 1139 in singles and 715 in doubles. She won two ITF doubles titles, and 14 medals at the Southeast Asian Games, representing Philippines.

Playing for Philippines in Fed Cup, Dy has a win–loss record of 9–6.

ITF Circuit finals

Singles (0–1)

Doubles (2–1)

Fed Cup participation

Singles

Doubles

External links
 
 
 

1989 births
Living people
Filipino female tennis players
Sportspeople from San Jose, California
Tennis players at the 2006 Asian Games
Tennis players at the 2014 Asian Games
Southeast Asian Games gold medalists for the Philippines
Southeast Asian Games competitors for the Philippines
Southeast Asian Games silver medalists for the Philippines
Southeast Asian Games bronze medalists for the Philippines
Southeast Asian Games medalists in tennis
Competitors at the 2017 Southeast Asian Games
Asian Games competitors for the Philippines